Olympique Thiès is a Senegalese football club based in Thiès.

In 1964 and 1966 Olympique Thiès has won the Senegal Premier League.

History
They played for many years in the top division the Senegal Premier League in Senegalese football.

Stadium
Currently the team plays at the Stade de Thiès.

Achievements
Senegal Premier League: 5
 1964, 1966

References

External links
Calziozz
Footbase

Football clubs in Senegal
Sport in Thiès